The Montjuïc Funicular is a funicular railway in the city of Barcelona, in Catalonia, Spain. The railway mainly runs through a tunnel and connects the Barcelona Metro's Paral·lel station (with connections to lines L2 and L3) with the hill of Montjuïc and the various sporting facilities and other attractions there.

The upper station of the funicular is adjacent to the lower station of the Montjuïc Cable Car, a gondola lift that continues uphill to a terminal near the Montjuïc Castle at the summit of the hill.

Overview

The funicular is part of the Autoritat del Transport Metropolità integrated fare network and is listed on maps as part of the metro network. It is operated by Transports Metropolitans de Barcelona (TMB), which also operates most of the metro lines.

The funicular is one of three funiculars in Barcelona, the other two being the Funicular de Vallvidrera and the Funicular del Tibidabo, although neither of these is operated by TMB.

Technical parameters
The railway has a single track configuration with a passing loop between stations.

History 
The railway was opened in 1928 in order to serve the International Exhibition of 1929. Until around 1970, the funicular included a second upper stage that linked the current upper station with Montjuïc Castle.  This connection is now provided by the Montjuïc Cable Car.

In preparation for the 1992 Summer Olympics, the railway was extensively reconstructed that year in order to serve the Estadi Olímpic Lluís Companys stadium and other Olympic facilities that were built on the Montjuïc hill.

References

External links 
Photographic description and map of the line from Trens de Catalunya (in Catalan)

1200 mm gauge railways in Spain
Funicular railways in Barcelona
Railway lines opened in 1928
Transport in Sants-Montjuïc
Underground funiculars
Underground rapid transit in Spain